Rivers of Fire and Ice, alternatively titled African Safari, is a Crown International Pictures 1969 motion picture filmed in documentary format. Directed, written and produced by wildlife photographer Ron Shanin, the film is an account of a safari through "wildest" Africa and explores Africa's diversity, ranging from scorching deserts to the frozen heights of Mount Kilimanjaro, and the life of the continent's inhabitants. The movie culminates with the eruption of Mt Kilimanjaro.

See also
 List of American films of 1969

External links

 Web site page of Crown International Pictures with brief details about 'African Safari'.

1969 films
Films about elephants
Films about lions
American films based on actual events
Films set in Africa
American documentary films
Crown International Pictures films
Films shot in Kenya
1960s English-language films
1960s American films